The 2000 Atlantic Coast Conference men's basketball tournament took place from March 9–12 in Charlotte, North Carolina, at the second Charlotte Coliseum. Duke won the tournament for the second year in a row, defeating Maryland in the championship game. Jason Williams of Duke was the tournament MVP.

Bracket

AP rankings at time of tournament

Television

Local radio

References

External links
 

Tournament
ACC men's basketball tournament
College sports in North Carolina
Basketball competitions in Charlotte, North Carolina
ACC men's basketball tournament
ACC men's basketball tournament